The Song of the Heart (Italian: La canzone del cuore) is a 1955 Italian melodrama film directed by Carlo Campogalliani and starring Milly Vitale, Alberto Farnese and Dante Maggio.

The film's sets were designed by Ivo Battelli.

Cast

References

Bibliography
 James Robert Parish & Kingsley Canham. Film Directors Guide: Western Europe. Scarecrow Press, 1976.

External links

The Song of the Heart at Variety Distribution

1955 films
1955 drama films
Italian drama films
1950s Italian-language films
Films directed by Carlo Campogalliani
Films with screenplays by Mario Amendola
Melodrama films
Italian black-and-white films
1950s Italian films